Jorrit is a West Frisian masculine given name derived via Jouwert (equivalent to Dutch Evert) from Everhard (German "Eberhard"). It is used throughout the Netherlands since the 1960s. People with this name include:

Jorrit Bergsma (born 1986), Dutch speed skater
Jorrit Croon (born 1998), Dutch field hockey player
Jorrit Hendrix (born 1995), Dutch footballer
Jorrit Kamminga (born 1976), Dutch political scientist
Jorrit van der Kooi (born 1972), Dutch film and TV director
Jorrit Kunst (born 1989), Dutch footballer
Jorrit de Ruiter (born 1986), Dutch badminton player
Jorrit Smeets (born 1995), Dutch footballer

References

Dutch masculine given names